The La Roche-sur-Foron–Saint-Gervais-les-Bains-Le Fayet railway is a railway line in the Auvergne-Rhône-Alpes region of France. It runs  from La Roche-sur-Foron to Saint-Gervais-les-Bains.

References

External links 
 

Railway lines in Auvergne-Rhône-Alpes
25 kV AC railway electrification